The Guanay cormorant or Guanay shag (Leucocarbo bougainvilliorum) is a member of the cormorant family found on the Pacific coast of Peru and northern Chile.  (The Argentinian population on the Patagonian Atlantic coast appears to be extirpated.) After breeding it spreads south to southern parts of Chile and north to Ecuador, and has also been recorded as far north as Panama and Colombia – probably a result of mass dispersal due to food shortage in El Niño years. Its major habitats include shallow seawater and rocky shores.

The Guanay cormorant is similar in coloration to the rock shag, Leucocarbo magellanicus, but larger, measuring 78 cm from the tip of the bill to the end of the tail. Its bill is grayish with some red at the base. The face is red with a green eye-ring. It has roseate feet. The head, neck and back are black as are the outer parts of the thighs. The throat patch, breast and belly are white. In breeding plumage it has a few white feathers on the sides of the head and neck.

Breeding occurs year-round with a peak in November and December. The nest is built of guano on flat surfaces on offshore islands or remote headlands. There are up to three nests per square meter in high-density colonies. The Guanay cormorant lays two or three eggs of approximately 63 × 40 mm in size.

It feeds mainly on the Peruvian anchoveta, Engraulis ringens, and the Peruvian silverside, Odontesthes regia, which thrive in the cold Humboldt Current. The Guanay cormorant is the main producer of guano.

Habitat loss and degradation and over-fishing have resulted in a steady decline of the population of about 30% from an estimated figure of three million birds in 1984. This species is listed as Near Threatened by IUCN.

Some taxonomic authorities, including the International Ornithologists' Union, place this species in the genus Leucocarbo. Others place it in the genus Phalacrocorax.

The scientific name commemorates the French explorer Louis Antoine de Bougainville. The bird's droppings were such an important source of fertilizer to the peoples of the Andes that it was protected by Inca rulers, who supposedly made disturbing the cormorants in any way punishable by death.

References

External links 
 

Guanay cormorant
Guanay cormorant
Birds of Chile
Birds of Peru
Birds of Ecuador
Birds of Patagonia
Taxa named by René Lesson
Western South American coastal birds